Crittenden County may mean:

In the United States:
 Crittenden County, Arkansas 
 Crittenden County, Kentucky